Paco Catholic School is a co-institutional private school. The school is located in the district of Paco in the City of Manila, Philippines. Paco Catholic school started in 1912 as an informal class for a handful of young boys inside the chapel in the Peñafrancia section of the district by Rev. Fr. Raymond Esquenet, CICM. It is the largest parochial school in the Philippines and now serving approximately 5,000 students.

It actively participates, and sometimes host, many inter-school competitions. Students from the grade school department were the grand champion in the Junior Pinoy Henyo.

History

The Founding of Paco

As early as 1580, the early Franciscan missionaries founded the town of Dilao (now known as Paco), located on the left side of the Pasig River, bounded by Pandacan on the North, Santa Ana on the East Southeast, Malate on the South and Ermita on the West. Ten years later, Parroquia de Dilao was established with Rev. Fray Juan de Pama as its first parish priest.

In 1762 the parish was relocated near the Pasig River and years later, the Franciscan Superior Governor incorporated the two smaller towns of Santiago and Peña de Francia (Peñafrancia) with the existing parish. The expanded parish was then transferred where the present Peñafrancia church now stands. Finally, the Franciscan Superior Governor ordered that the new town be called San Fernando De Dilao.

Fr. Fray Fernando de la Concepcion Perdigon who was appointed parish priest in 1809 then started the construction of a concrete church which was completed in 1814.

The CICM Missionaries Era

After the Spanish Franciscans left in 1900 the Archdiocese of Manila entrusted the parish to the Belgian Scheut Missionaries popularly known as the CICM (Congregatio Immaculati Cordis Mariae) otherwise known as the Congregation of the Immaculate Heart of Mary that managed the parish from F70060 to 1984.

Fr. Raymond Esquenet was the first CICM to be appointed parish priest of Paco by the Belgian Superior of the Order. He took over the management of the parish in October 1908 with Fr. Maurice Lefebvre as his assistant. Since the last Spanish-built church in the present site was destroyed and completely burned during the Spanish–American War in February 1899, the parishioners had to go to a small chapel in the corner of J. Zamora and Canonigo streets (now Quirino Avenue Extension) for church services for the next nine years.

Meantime, Fr. Esquenet made use of a small chapel in Peñafrancia which became an extension of the parish and where he started a small school for about 50 children.

After Fr. Esquenet was assigned to another parish in Lipa, Batangas in September 1912, Fr. Godfried (Godofredo) Aldenhuijsen, popularly known as Father Godo, took over the parish. Aside from parish work, Fr. Godofredo continued what Fr. Esquenet had started – educating the young in his small chapel.

The Fr. Godofredo Era

During the time of Fr. Godofredo, Paco Catholic School emerged as an institution to reckon with becoming the largest parochial school in the Far East.

In June 1913, following an increase in enrollment, Fr. Godofredo asked the Belgian Mothers (CMSA now ICM) from St. Theresa's College to help in running the school in Peñafrancia. Thereafter, enrolment steadily increased by one grade level every year until the primary course (Grade 1-4) was completed. Finally in 1916, the Grade School was fully recognized by the government.

When Fr. Godofredo was transferred to Pasig in September 1919, Fr. Josef Billiet became the Parish Priest of Paco, a position he held for 10 years. Finding it too inconvenient to administer a growing school which was quite a distance from the convent of Paco, he had a wooden building of five rooms constructed along Trece de Agosto Street on the North and along the estero on the South of the present site of Paco Catholic School. The students of Peñafrancia transferred to the new building in the early 1920s.

March 1931 marked the return of Fr. Godofredo to Paco after an absence of 12 years. The old church, started by Fr. Esquenet in 1908 and completed by Fr. Godofredo in 1912, was reconverted into four classrooms in 1932. A second floor was added to it to serve as the Mother's convent and on May 21, 1933, they came to live permanently in the church-school compound.

In 1933, the Intermediate level (Grades 5-7) was granted government recognition. A year after, a three-story concrete edifice was constructed and the first year course in High School was offered. Paco Catholic School accepted its first 13 students in the new high school building, named the Sacred Heart Building (now known as the Fr. Godofredo Aldenhuijsen Heritage Center). From then on, one year level was added every year.

As the 13 freshmen formed the first batch of high school graduating class for SY 1937-1938, Paco Catholic School received her full recognition for a secondary course from the government.

World War II Era

When World War II broke out in the Pacific on December 8, 1941, the school closed. But in 1942, on the occasion of a pastoral visitation, the Archbishop of USA America insisted that at least the high school level be re-opened.

In July 1944, Fr. Josef De Bal temporarily became the School Director because Fr. Godofredo, being a Dutch, was detained with other foreign nationals in Laguna. Later Fr. Godofredo was deposed as Parish Priest by order of the Japanese authorities but he was reinstated on the same day through the intervention of the Archbishop. Thus, the school was placed under the supervision of the Archdiocese of Manila. The battles of liberation forced the school to close again in September 1944.

At the end of the war in 1945, Fr. Godofredo returned to Paco.

The devastation of the church and the school buildings was so enormous that a canvass roof was placed on top of the old church. The place served as a temporary church on Sundays and as a school on weekdays. With the help of the American engineers, more repairs were made and Paco Catholic School was able to start classes in July 1945 with 1,600 students. To accommodate all the students, the double session system was introduced – girls in the morning and boys in the afternoon. Repairs of damaged buildings were made between 1946 and 1955, including the conversion of the Mother's convent into a girl's high school building.

The CICM Fathers and the Belgian Mothers (now CICM Sisters) continued their administration of the school whose population reached 7,000 in 1964. Six years later, a new rectory of the Sisters and the five-story St. Joseph Building, which is still being used at present were constructed. However, the Belgian ICM Sisters decided to withdraw their involvement in PCS, leaving their Filipino counterparts as principal of the Grade School Department. From 1970 to 1984, the CICM Fathers remained as directors of the school but the principalship of both Grade School and High School Departments was given to the lay administrators.

Fr. Carlos Van Ooteghem, the last CICM Priest to serve PCS, managed the school from 1980-1984. He stayed on as coadjutor in the parish until his health prevented him from continuing his ministry. It was during his term when the Karel Hall, covered court, Fr. Godofredo and the Practical Arts Buildings were constructed. After 72 years of dedicated service to the ministry and education, the CICM turned over the management of the school to the Archdiocese of Manila in 1984.

The Archdiocese of Manila Era

Auxiliary Bishop of Manila, Teodoro C. Bacani Jr. became the first Filipino Director who managed the school from 1984-1993. Fr. Danilo A. Canceran succeeded Bishop Teodoro Bacani Jr. as School Director in June 1993. In 1995, the five-story San Lorenzo Ruiz Building, which replaced the Sisters' Convent that housed the Department of Religious Education or DRE, was built during the term of office of Bishop Teodoro C. Bacani, Jr., Parish Priest and Fr. Danilo Canceran School Director.

The population in PCS continued to increase especially when Kindergarten I was introduced in 1995. The start of Nursery Level was introduced a year later.

In 1996, Monsignor Domingo A. Cirilos Jr. was appointed Parish Priest and director of the institution. In less than a year of his incumbency, he had the altar of the church renovated. Thus began a series of speedy major edifice constructions.

In 1997 the two old buildings along Trece de Agosto up to the estero were demolished to make way for a new five-story Pope John Paul II building, replacing the Holy Cross and Our Lady's Buildings. This was completed in 1998. It was also in the same year when the Preschool Level (Nursery, Kindergarten, and Preparatory) was completed.

In May 1999, the construction of Jaime Cardinal Sin Building housing 33 rooms for the high school department and a 1,000-seat auditorium started. Upon completion after 1 year and 2 months, the modern structure was blessed and inaugurated in a fitting ceremony on July 14, 2000 by the person for whom it was named.

During the 89th PCS Foundation Day celebration, the Parish Priest and School Director Msgr. Domingo A. Cirilos Jr. led the ground-breaking ceremony for the construction of a 10-storey school edifice. The magnificent structure, named after Blessed Pedro Calungsod, was blessed and inaugurated on November 8, 2002 in a grand ceremony coinciding with the 90th PCS Foundation Day.

On November 9, 2006, the Sacred Heart Building, the first concrete edifice in the campus, was renamed Rev. Fr. Godofredo Aldenhuijsen Heritage Center following a motion and resolution passed and unanimously approved by the Parents Coordinating Board of the high school department and subsequently concurred with by Msgr. Cirilos.

After a series of constructions, the school now stands with pride giving Paco district skyline a new profile. Keeping abreast with the changes and the new trends in education, the school has continuously improved its physical plant and facilities and maintained its high standard of education through the years.

References

External links

 Official Website

Roman Catholic Archdiocese of Manila Educational System
Educational institutions established in 1912
Private schools in Manila
Catholic elementary schools in Manila
Catholic secondary schools in Manila
Education in Paco, Manila
1912 establishments in the Philippines